is a city located in eastern Shizuoka Prefecture, Japan. ,  the city had an estimated population of 51,216 in 21,858 households, and a population density of 370 persons per km².

Mottos of Susono city 
 Enjoy working and make a healthy city.
 Be kind to people and make living in the city more pleasant.
 Maintain social order and build a peaceful city.
 Protect nature and make a beautiful city.
 Respect old traditions and make a cultured city.

Geography
Susono is located in far eastern Shizuoka Prefecture, Japan, in the foothills of Mount Fuji, Mount Ashitaka, and the Hakone Mountains. The climate is temperate maritime, with hot humid summers and mild winters.

Surrounding municipalities
Shizuoka Prefecture
Mishima
Gotemba
Nagaizumi
Fuji
Kanagawa Prefecture
Hakone

Demographics
Per Japanese census data, the population of Susono has been increasing over the past 70 years.

Climate
The city has a climate characterized by hot and humid summers, and relatively mild winters (Köppen climate classification Cfa).  The average annual temperature in Susono is 13.8 °C. The average annual rainfall is 1916 mm with September as the wettest month. The temperatures are highest on average in August, at around 25.0 °C, and lowest in January, at around 3.3 °C.

History
During the Edo period, the area was mostly tenryō territory under direct control of the Tokugawa shogunate. After the Meiji Restoration, on February 1, 1889, a train station was opened in the center of rural Suntō District on what later became the Tōkaidō Main Line connecting Tokyo with Shizuoka. With the establishment of the modern municipalities system in April of the same year, the area was reorganized into 24 villages. Originally called "Sano Station", the train station was renamed Susono Station in 1915. Susono Town was founded on April 4, 1952, through the merger of Koizumi and Izumi Villages. On September 30, 1956, Fukara Village merged with Susono Town, and on September 1, 1957, Tomioka and Suyama Villages also merged. Susono became a city on January 1, 1971. The design of the city flag represents the union of the original five villages.

Government
Atami has a mayor-council form of government with a directly elected mayor and a unicameral city legislature of 19 members.

Economy
Susono has a mixed economy. As an industrial city, it hosts several automobile or automotive components plants, including a plant owned by Toyota Motor Corporation and one by its subsidiary Kanto Auto Works. Mitsubishi Aluminum Corporation and  Canon also have factories in the city. In  April, 2007, the head office of Yazaki Corporation, an automotive components manufacturer, was moved from Yokohama to Susono.

Agricultural products include Strawberries, bamboo shoots, and pork.

Toyota has begun the construction of the smart city, Woven City, in 2021.

Education
Susono has eight public elementary schools and five public middle schools operated by the city government, and one public high school (Shizuoka Prefectural Susono High School) operated by the Shizuoka Prefectural Board of Education. In addition, there is also one private combined middle/high school.

Transportation

Railways
 Central Japan Railway Company - Gotemba Line
  -

Highways

Local attractions

Recreational facilities
 The Mt. Fuji Museum
 Fuji Safari Park]
 Yeti (ski resort)
 Gurimpa (amusement park)
 Chuchan Stock Farm
 Healthy Park Susono
 Campsites in Jurigi
 Citizen Culture Center 
 Welfare Health Hall
 Sports Park (baseball ground, tennis court, long roller slide, large grass area to play other sports)

Events held in Susono
 JLPGA Stanley Ladies Golf Tournament
 Mt. Fuji Japanese Apricot Festival
 Mt. Fuji International Snowball Fight Contest
 Susono Summer Festival
 Mt. Fuji Walking Festival
 Japanese/English Speech Contest

Sister City relations
  - City of Frankston, Melbourne, Australia.

References

External links

 Susono City official website 

 
Cities in Shizuoka Prefecture